Shyampur Baraitala Railway Station is a railway station located in Shyampur Thana, Dhaka District, Bangladesh. It was established in 2017.

History 
The demand for jute was increasing all over the world. For the purpose of meeting that growing demand, there was a need for better communication system than the existing communication system to supply jute from Eastern Bengal to Port of Kolkata. Therefore in 1885 a 144 km wide meter gauge railway line named Dhaka State Railway was constructed to bring raw jute to Kolkata mainly by river which connects Mymensingh with Narayanganj. Shyampur Baraitala railway station was built as part of the project during the construction of Narayanganj–Bahadurabad Ghat line.

Trains
Shyampur Baraitla railway station serves trains of Narayanganj Commuter and Narayanganj Local.

References

Railway stations in Dhaka District
Railway stations opened in 2017
2017 establishments in Bangladesh